Kalur Karim (also Romanized as Kalūr Karīm) is a village in Mishan Rural District, Mahvarmilani District, Mamasani County, Fars Province, Iran. At the 2006 census, its population was 35, in 7 families.

References 

Populated places in Mamasani County